Polesworth railway station serves the village of Polesworth in Warwickshire, England. It is situated on the Trent Valley section of the West Coast Main Line.

Since 2005, only the northbound platform has been accessible to passengers due to the removal of the footbridge, and the station has been served only by a parliamentary train service of one northbound train a day. In 2018/19 it was the least used station in Warwickshire and in the West Midlands and the ninth least used station in Great Britain.

History
Polesworth station was opened with the line on 15 September 1847 by the London and North Western Railway.

The line through the station was originally double track, but was widened to quadruple track between 1901 and 1903. A large gap exists between the tracks in the middle of the station, this is because space was made for a planned island platform which was never built. However, there was a signal box in the space until it was closed in 1990.

When the Coventry to Nuneaton Line was reopened to passenger trains in 1987, the service was diverted to terminate at  instead of Rugby. The May 1974 timetable shows six daily trains between Stafford and Rugby in each direction, calling at Polesworth. The May 2000 timetable shows the service reduced to five daily trains between Stafford and Coventry.  

Between May 2004, and December 2005 Polesworth station was closed due to the modernisation of the West Coast Main Line. During this period, the footbridge to platform 2 was removed by contractors and was not replaced. Thus, since the station reopened, it has received only a single daily parliamentary service by London Northwestern Railway, in the northbound direction only. This consists of a Northampton to Crewe train, calling at 06:50 Monday to Friday and at 07:22 Saturday.

In 2005 the Strategic Rail Authority called for Polesworth station to be closed, in its "West Midlands Route Utilisation Strategy", noting that each train that calls there receives on average fewer than one passenger.

Accidents
On 21 July 1947, an express train from Euston to Liverpool derailed at speed on a curve around one mile south of the station, resulting in five deaths and nineteen serious injuries, with another 45 sustaining minor injury. The inquiry blamed the accident on the poor condition of the track, which was near the end of its life and in need of renewal; a major contributing factor was the backlog of track maintenance and renewals which had built up due to World War II.

Another derailment of a passenger train occurred at the station on 19 November 1951, which overturned the locomotive and caused minor injuries to two people. This was blamed on the driver missing a caution signal, and then running over a crossover between the fast and slow lines at excessive speed.

Future proposals
In July 2019 Warwickshire County Council's Draft Rail Strategy for 2019–2034 proposed that a new station called Polesworth Parkway could be opened at a different location in proximity to the A5 road and B5000, which if approved could go ahead between 2027 and 2033. No mention is made of what could happen to the existing station.

References

External links

 Polesworth station entry on Warwickshire Railways

Railway stations in Warwickshire
DfT Category F2 stations
Former London and North Western Railway stations
Railway stations in Great Britain opened in 1847
Railway stations served by West Midlands Trains
Low usage railway stations in the United Kingdom
1847 establishments in England
John William Livock buildings
Polesworth
Railway accidents and incidents in Warwickshire
1947 disasters in the United Kingdom
Stations on the West Coast Main Line